Marco A. Marra is a Distinguished Scientist and Director of Canada's Michael Smith Genome Sciences Centre at the BC Cancer Research Centre and Professor of Medical Genetics at the University of British Columbia (UBC). He also serves as UBC Canada Research Chair in Genome Science for the Canadian Institutes of Health Research and is an inductee in the Canadian Medical Hall of Fame. Marra has been instrumental in bringing genome science to Canada by demonstrating the pivotal role that genomics can play in human health and disease research.

Education and Early Life 
Canadian born and educated, Dr. Marco Marra received a B.Sc. in Molecular & Cell Biology and a PhD in Genetics from Simon Fraser University. The title of his PhD thesis: “Genome analysis in Caenorhabditis elegans: Genetic and molecular identification of genes tightly linked to unc-22(IV)”.

Marra trained as a post-doctoral fellow at the Washington University School of Medicine in St Louis, Missouri. He went on to become Group Leader of both the EST (Express Sequence Tag) Sequencing Team and Genome Fingerprinting and Mapping Teams at Washington University’s Genome Sequence Center (renamed the McDonnell Genome Institute), one of the top two sequencing centers in the world at that time.

In 1998, Nobel Laureate Dr. Michael Smith and Dr. Victor Ling set out to establish the Genome Sequence Centre in Vancouver. At their request, Marra returned to British Columbia to head the Mapping and Sequencing teams.

Career and Research 
During his first two years with British Columbia’s Genome Sequence Center (renamed Canada's Michael Smith Genome Sciences Centre), Marra served as head of the Mapping and Sequencing teams, Associate Director and Scientific Co-Director. He also held the position of Senior Scientist at BC Cancer Research and Adjunct Professor for the Department of Medical Genetics. Marra subsequently became Professor and Head of the Department of Medical Genetics in the Faculty of Medicine at UBC.

From 2011 to 2018, Marra founded and co-directed the Genome Science and Technology Graduate Program at UBC. He also lent his expertise to the Department of Molecular Biology and Biochemistry at Simon Fraser University, serving as Adjunct Professor from 2001 to 2015. Marra currently holds the position of BC Node Leader for the Terry Fox Research Institute.

Canada's Michael Smith Genome Science Centre 
Marra took over as Director of Canada's Michael Smith Genome Sciences Centre (GSC) when Dr. Smith died of cancer in 2000. As of 2021, the GSC has more than 280 scientists, trainees and staff and a grant funding level averaging more than 25 million dollars each year. Marra has mentored many scientists and graduate students who are now providing the expertise and insight needed to fulfill the promise of genomics through technological innovation, enhanced informatics and creative clinical applications.

Human Genome Project 
Along with GSC co-director, Dr. Steven J.M. Jones, Marra was instrumental in creating the first map the human genome, an international initiative that allowed the data to remain in the public domain. One of the largest collaborative scientific projects in history, the Human Genome Project begun in 1990 and completed in 2003. The massive and unprecedented scale of genomic data provided by the Human Genome Project has since revolutionized our understanding of disease biology ranging from cancer to cognitive impairment and continues to unfold new possibilities for integrating laboratory research and clinical practice to improve cancer control.

The paper published in the 15 February 2001 issue of Nature, titled "A physical map of the human genome", describes the construction and use of the human genome map to fuel human genome sequencing. Marra made fundamental contributions to that effort by devising and then implementing clonal fingerprinting techniques that led to the construction and use of the map, which served as the centralized coordinating resource for the sequencing effort.

Coronavirus 
Led by Marra, the GSC was first in the world to sequence the SARS virus in 2003. Using this information they were the first to identify SARS as a coronavirus. This discovery, along with knowledge of the SARS genome, had significant implications for many infectious diseases and vaccine development. Sequencing techniques used for SARs were also applied to many fields of research and discovery, including cancer.

In 2020, the GSC joined the Canadian COVID Genomics Network (CanCOGeN), a Genome Canada initiative to generate accessible and usable genomics data to inform COVID-19 public health decisions. The GSC was one of the first three facilities involved in sequencing 10,000 Canadians that tested positive for the virus (HostSeq) for this Government of Canada funded project. Research co-led by Marra also identified an alternative procedure for extracting nucleic acids for COVID-19 testing.

Precision Oncology

Personalized OncoGenomics 
As part of a GSC initiative, Marra played a pivotal role in the first proof-of-concept for the effective use of whole genome analyses in personalized cancer medicine, leading to the development of BC Cancer’s Personalized OncoGenomics (POG) program. POG, co-lead by Dr. Janessa Laskin, represents one of the first applications of whole genome sequencing in a clinical setting, using information derived from thousands of individual cancer genomes and transcriptomes to identify promising therapeutic targets in individual patients.

Marathon of Hope 
In 2019, Marra and the POG team became a key part of the Marathon of Hope Cancer Centres Network. Led by the Terry Fox Research Institute and the Terry Fox Foundation, with support from dozens of research and funding partners across Canada, this represents the country’s largest ever clinical data-sharing initiative. The Marathon of Hope aims to accelerate the adoption of precision medicine for cancer patients throughout Canada.  

Marra continues to extend the reach of genomics toward managing and eradicating disease. His research has uncovered new cancer mutations, candidate biomarkers and therapeutic targets, and has been instrumental in demonstrating the functional interplay between the cancer genome and epigenome.

Awards and honors 
Since 2014, Dr. Marra has been listed in the yearly Highly Cited Researchers and World’s Most Influential Scientific Minds by Thomson Reuters and Clarivate Analytics. This list recognizes world-class researchers selected for their exceptional research performance, demonstrated by production of multiple highly cited papers that rank in the top 1% by citations for field and year in Web of Science.

Marra's contributions to genome science led to an honorary Doctor of Science degree from Simon Fraser University in 2004, and an honorary Doctor of Laws degree from the University of Calgary in 2005. He is also a recipient of the Order of British Columbia and became a member of the Canadian Medical Hall of Fame in 2020.

References

1966 births
Living people
Canadian geneticists
Human Genome Project scientists
People from the Municipal District of Peace No. 135
Simon Fraser University alumni